Tonkawa Lodge No. 157 A.F. & A.M., at 112 N. 7th St. in Tonkawa, Oklahoma, was listed on the National Register of Historic Places in 2007.

It is a two-story red brick building, built in 1924 to 1925 and is Classical Revival in style.  It was designed by Oklahoma City architects Hawk & Parr.

References

Masonic buildings in Oklahoma
National Register of Historic Places in Kay County, Oklahoma
Neoclassical architecture in Oklahoma